Ekramul Alam Politician of Natore District of Bangladesh and former member of Parliament for Natore-4 constituency in February 1996.

Political life 
Ekramul Alam was the principal of Bonpara Degree College from its inception. He was the president and upazila chairman of Baraigram Upazila BNP. He was elected to parliament from Natore-4 as a Bangladesh Nationalist Party candidate in 15 February 1996 Bangladeshi general election.

Death 
Ekramul Alam died on 26 November 2015.

References 

Year of birth missing
2015 deaths
People from Natore District
Bangladesh Nationalist Party politicians
6th Jatiya Sangsad members